Kapurthala is a city in Punjab state of India. It is the administrative headquarters of Kapurthala District. It was the capital of the Kapurthala State, a princely state in British India. The aesthetic mix of the city with its prominent buildings based on French and Indo-Saracenic architecture self-narrate its princely past. It is also known as city of Palaces & Gardens. According to the 2011 Census, Kapurthala is the least populated city in India.

History
Kapurthala town was founded by Rana Kapur, a Bhati Rajput of Jaisalmer in 11th century. From 11th century to 1772, Kapurthala was under the control of Bhatti Rajputs, who served as feudatories under Delhi Sultanate and the Mughal Empire.

Princely state

In 1772, Kapurthala was seized from Bhatti Rajputs and was annexed into Kapurthala State by the Ahluwalia Sikh rulers. Kapurthala flag has two color background, with insignia and moto that says "pro rege et patria" (in Latin) meaning "For king and country"

Demographics
As per provisional data of 2011 census Kapurthala had a population of 101,854, out of which males were 55,485 and females were 46,169. The literacy rate was 85.82 per cent.

Monuments and buildings

The City of Kapurthala has several buildings and places of interest linked to its local history such as the Sainik School (Formerly Jagatjit Palace), Shalimar Bagh (Gardens), District Courts buildings, Moorish Mosque, Panch Mandir ("Five Temples"), Clock Tower, State Gurudwara, Kanjli Wetlands, 15,000-capacity field hockey venue Guru Nanak Stadium, Jagjit Club, and the NJSA Government college. The city also have first climatic change theater of country.

Sainik School (Jagatjit Palace)

The Sainik School, formerly known as Jagatjit Palace, is housed in what was formerly the palace of the erstwhile Maharajah of Kapurthala state, Maharajah Jagatjit Singh. It was designed by a French architect M. Marcel and built by a local builder Allah Ditta. It was built in renaissance style with the sunken park in the front (Known as Baija). Its Durbar Hall (Diwan-E-Khas) is one of the finest in India, and the Plaster of Paris figures and painted ceilings represent the finest features of French and Italian art and architecture. The construction of this palace was commenced in 1900 and completed in 1908 in time for the new wife of the Maharajah Anita Delgado.

Darbar Hall (Diwan -e-Aam) Old Courts 
The stately Durbar Hall stands proudly at the heart of the city of Kapurthala, Punjab. It was, at one time the Court of Maharaja Jagatjit Singh, its creator. Maharaja's annual birthday celebrations and other state rituals and ceremonies were also held here. The Highest Court of Appeal after Maharaja's Court was Chief Justice Court, The Last Chief Justice of Kapurthala State was His Lordship   Hon’ble Justice Pandit Dwarka Dass Randev from 1938 till 1947, He was Son of Dewan Lala Shiv Narayan Randev (Collector And Chief Secretary ) Of Maharaja Jagatjit Singh of Kapurthala and Nephew of Chief Judge Of Kapurthala Hon’ble Justice Lala Bhagat Ram Randev from 1901 to 1913 . This complex after independence 1947 to 2016, was the District Courts Complex which houses the Court of the District and the Sessions Judge as well as the offices of the Deputy Commissioner. The Durbar Hall was completed in 1889. Its architecture represents Indo-Saracenic style. There is a beautiful upper deck gallery running on both sides. It unfolds stylized domes and canopies, and superb lattice work executed in stone. Facing the massive wooden door of the main entrance is a splendid bronze equestrian statue of Raja Randhir Singh.

Elysee Palace
The Elysee Palace was commissioned by Kanwar Bikrama Singh and completed in 1862. This building has now been converted into MGN School of Kapurthala.

Moorish Mosque

An example of the secular history of Kapurthala is the Moorish Mosque, a replica of the Grand Mosque of Marrakesh, Morocco, was built by a French architect, Monsieur M Manteaux. Its construction was commissioned by the last ruler of Kapurthala, Maharajah Jagatjit Singh and took 13 years to complete between 1917 and 1930. It was then consecrated in the presence of the late Nawab of Bhawalpur. The Mosque's inner dome contains decorations by the artists of the Mayo School of Art, Lahore. The Mosque is a National Monument under the Archaeological Survey of India. It was one of the monumental creations in the State during the premiership of late Diwan Sir Abdul Hamid Kt., CIE, OBE. It was his keen interest with Maharaja's blessings that the mosque was completed. Its wooden model lay at the entrance of the Lahore Museum.

Jagatjit Club

Jagatjit Club is an elegant building situated in the heart of the city based on the Greek roman style of architecture. Its design loosely resembles the Parthenon on the Acropolis of Athens and features the Coat of Arms of the erstwhile ruling family of Kapurthala with their royal motto "Pro Rege et Patria" (For King and Country) on its pediment. The building has been used for a variety of purposes since it was constructed, it was used as a church in the early nineteenth century, as a cinema hall in the 1940s and now houses a local club which includes a well built badminton court, a card room and a dining hall.

Gol Kothi 
Gol Kothi’ which stands opposite to the official residence of  senior superintendent of police (SSP) has a rich history. It was built by famous Companion of Maharaja Ranjit Singh And Ruler of Kapurthala State  Raja Fateh Singh Ahluwalia Saheb Of Kapurthala in the year 1833 and was once the residence of Dewan(Chief Minister)  Of Kapurthala erstwhile princely state.Later, The Last Maharaja of Kapurthala Maharaja Sir Jagatjit Singh Saheb Bahadur Ahluwalia spent his formative years in the building in the 1880s.

Shalimar Gardens
 
Shalimar Gardens  are situated in roughly the centre of the city and provide an escape from the hustle-bustle of the city. The Shahi Samadhs (The Royal Cenotaphs) in the Shalimar Gardens emphasize the traditions of its ruling Dynasty. Marble obelisks inside the red sandstone Chambers, are Memorials to the former Rulers and their families. Nearby, a grand structure built in 1880 and built on a marble plinth, houses the Samadhs of Maharajas Kharak Singh, Jagatjit Singh and Paramjit Singh.

Panch Mandir (Five Temples)
Panch Mandir of Kapurthala is a place of reverence for all faiths. The temple complex is home to five small temples. Built during the reign of Sardar Fateh Singh, an extraordinary feature of this temple is that from the entry door, one can view all the five idols and pay obeisance to all. There is a temple Mandir Shivala Dewan Banna Mal Gautam in Nawanshahr Which is replica  of Panch Mandir Kapurthala. Dewan Banna Mal Gautam was Chief Minister of Kapurthala State and Manager of His Highness Maharaja Sir Randhir Singh Bahadur of Kapurthala's estates in Oudh.

The State Gurdwara
The large and imposing red sandstone building (now painted white) of the State Gurudwara was consecrated in 1915 under the charge of Revail Singh. Built in the Indo-Saracenic style, it has vast expanses of marble haloed by the feet of the hundreds of devotees. It is situated in the center of the city on the Sultanpur road. Recently, it is being renovated. There is a big park behind the Gurudwara building.

Brahmkund Mandir 
Mukhi Shiv Ling Brahmkund Temple is the jathere of Gautam Brahmin( Shori Gotra)  Family of Dewan Banna Mal Gautam (Misr). Dewan Banna Mal was born in Nawanshahr in Gautam Brahmin ( Shori Gotra) Family, Banna Mal was son of Vaid Jhanda Mal, This temple was built by Dewan Banna Mal's sons Dewan Acchru Mal Gautam Revenue Minister Of Kapurthala State and Dewan Sundri Mal Gautam. Dewan Banna Mal was Dewan of Maharaja Randhir Singh Bahadur of Kapurthala and Manager of Kapurthala's estate in Oudh. Bana Malwala village in Mand area of Kapurthala is after Banna Mal's Name and Dewan Banna Mal has also built Mandir Shivala Dewan   Banna Mal in Nawanshahr.

Kanjli Wetlands
Kanjli Wetlands, on the western Bein rivulet at the outskirts of the city, has been included in under the Ramsar Convention. It is a common site for bird watching and boating. An enormous project is currently being undertaken here to develop it into a destination for bird watching replete with modern-day facilities. The Kanjli Wetlands have been in a state of neglect lately with little attention being given by the authorities to the condition of flora and fauna and its surrounding infrastructure.

Sultanpur Lodhi Places

Gurudwara Ber Sahib
The Gurdwara Ber Sahib is situated at Sultanpur Lodhi, which is one of the four sub-divisions (Tehsil) of Kapurthala. This historic site is of great importance to Sikhism as it is said to be the very place where the First Guru of Sikhs, Guru Nanak, spent 14 years (14 years 9 months 13 days) of his life . The place derives its name from a Ber tree (Zizyphus Jujuba) said to be planted by Guru Nanak himself and under which he first uttered the Mool Mantra or the "Sacred Word or Revelation" of Sikhism.

The Gurdwara Bebe Nanaki Ji
The Gurdwara Bebe Nanaki Ji is situated in the Sultanpur Lodhi City of Kapurthala Distt. The Gurdwara Bebe Nanaki Ji comprises a central hall, with the Guru Granth Sahib seated in a white marble palaki at the far end. The Guru Granth Sahib is also seated in a small side room symbolizing Bebe Nanaki’s own lodging. Over the sanctum, above the hall roof, is a square domed room with arched copings. Bulbous domes adorn the corners of the hall roof.

Gurudwara Shri Guru Ka Baag
Gurudwara Shri Guru Ka Baag is situated in the Sultanpur Lodhi city in Kapurthala Distt. Guru Nanak spent 14 years in Sultanpur Lodhi as a young man working for Nawab Daulat Khan Lodhi. This was the house of Guru Nanak where his two sons Baba Sri Chand and Baba Lakhmi Chand were born. Guru Nanak tested his two sons, but neither proved worthy of being his successor. Baba Lakhmi Chand was too involved in worldly affairs while Baba Sri Chand chose the path of renunciation and became an aesthetic. Guru Sahib used to have Langar prepared by Bibi Nanaki ji. Well (Khooh) is also located here, from which water was used for Langar Preparation.

Gurudwara Sri Sant Ghat Sahib
Gurudwara Sri Sant Ghat Sahib is situated in the Sultanpur Lodhi town of Kapurthala district. It is situated on the bank of Bein river. From Ber sahib, Satguru nanak dev ji dived into Bein and disappeared. The big reason for this place to be named sant ghaat is that maharaaj guru nanak dev ji meditated here to the akaal purakh and went from here to serve the World.

Places in Phagwara

Gurdwara Sukhchainana Sahib
This place belongs to the 6th Master Sri Guru Hargobind Sahib ji, during his visit in Phagwara City. Guru Hargobind Sahib Ji came here after fighting with mughals and rested here under the tree.

Mansa devi mandir
The temple is a famous shrine and pilgrimage spot in the city it is situated at Hadiabad, Phagwara

Climate

Transport
The City of Kapurthala is well connected with the main transport routes of the Punjab and Northern India. It is situated 19 km away toward South-West of its closest neighbouring city of Jalandhar.

Road
Kapurthala is connected to rest of state and India through National Highway 703A and Shri Guru Nanak Dev Ji Marg (NH 703AA).

Railway
The Kapurthala railway station which is located on Jalandhar–Firozpur line connects it to all parts of India through two major railway junctions stations of Jalandhar and Firozpur.

Air
The nearest airport to Kapurthala, Sri Guru Ram Dass Jee International Airport is located at Amritsar, about 75 km away.

Education
The main higher education institutions of Kapurthala are -
 I.K. Gujral Punjab Technical University 
 Lyallpur Khalsa College (Urban Estate) Kapurthala
G.N.D.U Regional Campus, Fattudhinga, Sultanpur Lodhi, Kapurthala, established in 2013.
College of Engineering and Management (CEM) 
SD Public School, Sheikhupur, Kapurthala
 NJSA Government College, established in 1856, popularly known as Randhir College, after its founder Randhir Singh of Kapurthala
Anand College of Engineering and Management (ACEM)
Hindu Kanya College for women
Bebe Nanki G.N.D.U college Mithra.
 Lord Krishna Polytechnic College (LKPC), Subhnapur road, Kapurthala
 Shaheed Udham Singh College of  Technology, Subhanpur Road, Kapurthala.(SUS COLLEGE)
 Sardar swaran singh national institute of bio energy.

There are numerous primary and secondary schools in Kapurthala, notably -

Anand Public Senior Secondary School
Bawa Lalvani Public School
Christ King Convent School, the only ICSE pattern based convent school in the city
Dhilwan International Public School (DIPS)
Govt. Girls Sr. Sec. School Kapurthala (Ghanta Ghar School)
J.K. Public Senior Secondary School (started by local personality Jhanda Mal Sharma)
Kendriya Vidyalaya Kapurthala Cantt
KR Jain DAV Public School
MDSD Sr Sec School
MGN Public School
Onkar Public Senior Secondary School
Prita Lee Lesson Senior Secondary School
Sainik School
Little Angels Co-Ed School
Randhir School
GTB International Sr. Sec. School
Premjot Sr Sec Public School
Cambridge International School

Culture and Films
The film 'Tanu Weds Manu' (2011) had some scenes shot in Kapurthala city and Kala Sanghian.
Kapurthala gives its name to the Kapurthala stomacher, a wedding gift from the Maharajah to Mary of Teck, the future Queen Mary, in 1893.
In the 2010 Pakistani drama Dastaan, a period drama that is set during the Partition of India, Kapurthala serves as the place where Bano, the main Muslim female character, is kept for nearly five years by a Sikh family.
Parts of Hindi movie Firangi (2017) were shot at Sainik School Kapurthala (Jagjit Palace). The appearance of the palace is different in the film compared to how it is in reality and it appears that parts of the school building were painted for the film as well the structure was altered using CGI.

Literature

Kapurthala is the birthplace of the renowned Urdu Poet, Mehr Lal Soni Zia Fatehabadi. Kapurthala is also the birthplace of the renowned Indian cricketer Lala Amarnath

Medical College
There is 5th Government Medical College (20 acres) under construction near Civil Hospital. The name of college is changed and new name is dedicated for 550th Birthday of Sri Guru Nanak Dev Ji. New name is Sri Guru Nanak Dev State Institute of Medical Sciences, Kapurthala ; Kapurthala Medical College; Government Medical College, Kapurthala. This college is 2nd Doaba Region MBBS teaching college after PIMS Jalandhar. This college will teach students from 2022 to 2023.

References

External links
Information about Kapurthala city - www.kapurthalainfo.com
Kapurthala, a City of Palaces - www.kapurthala.co.in
Kapurthala, a City with a Royal Ambiance - www.kapurthalacity.com
More Information about Kapurthala - www.kapurthalacity.info
Kapurthala City, official website - www.kapurthala.co.in
Information about Kapurthala city  - www.kapurthalaonline.com
Sights and street views of Kapurthala city (YouTube video -  www.youtube.com/watch?v=C9o94z3D0Yk
Information about Best College in Kapurthala - www.lkckpt.ac.in

 
Cities and towns in Kapurthala district